HD 83380 (HR 3833) is an orange-hued star in the southern constellation of Antlia. It shines faintly with a apparent magnitude of 5.62 when viewed in ideal conditions. Parallax measurements place the object at distance of 312 light-years.

HD 83380 has a stellar classification of K1 III, indicating that it is an evolved red giant. Gaia DR3 stellar evolution models place the object on the red giant branch. HD 83380 is slightly metal enriched with a metallicity 126% that of the Sun. It spins with a projected rotational velocity too low to be measured accurately, and is believed to be a member of the thin disk population.

The multiplicity status of HD 83380 isn't generally agreed on. De Mederios et al. (2014) found it to be a probable spectroscopic binary while Eggleton and Tokovinin (2008) list it as a solitary star.

References

K-type giants
Antlia
CD-31 07458
083380
047199
3833
Antliae, 17